The ISO/IEC Information Technology Task Force (ITTF) is a body jointly formed by ISO and IEC responsible for the planning and coordination of the work of JTC 1. It has several responsibilities described in the JTC 1 Directives clause 4.1 including:
 day-to-day planning and coordination of the technical work
 supervising the application of rules
 advising JTC 1 on points of procedure
 administration of ballots
 publishing activities, including the printing, distribution and sale of International Standards

Publishing activities 
The ITTF makes a number of International Standards and associated material available for free-of-charge download “for standardization purposes” Some well-known texts so available include:
 ISO/IEC 10646 Universal Multiple-Octet Coded Character Set (UCS)
 ISO/IEC 14977 Syntactic metalanguage — Extended BNF
 ISO/IEC 19757-2 Regular-grammar-based validation — RELAX NG
 ISO/IEC 26300 Open Document Format for Office Applications (OpenDocument) v1.0
 ISO/IEC 29500 Office Open XML File Formats

References

External links 
 ITTF web site
 Publicly available standards

Standards organisations in Switzerland
International Organization for Standardization
International Electrotechnical Commission